Qarvchah, also rendered as Qarvchay, may refer to:
 Qarvchah-e Olya
 Qarvchah-e Sofla